is a song recorded by Japanese singer Shizuka Kudo. It was released as a double A-side single alongside "Night Wing" by Pony Canyon on November 5, 2008.

Background and composition
"Yukigasa" is Kudo's first single to be released as a double A-side, with "Night Wing". The 1998 B-side "In the Sky", from the single "Kirara", was treated as an A-side, but never officially released as such. "Yukigasa", as well as "Night Wing", was written and composed by Miyuki Nakajima, and arranged by Ichizō Seo. The single marks Kudo's first collaboration with Nakajima in two years, since "Clāvis (Kagi)". It is described as a "feminine" ballad. Lyrically, the song tells a winter love story of a woman finally finding someone to spend her birthday with. The song is composed in the key of C minor and Kudo's vocals span from G3 to B4 in modal voice, and up to C5 in head voice.

Chart performance
"Yukigasa" debuted at number 75 on the Oricon Singles Chart, with 1,000 copies sold. The single charted for two weeks and sold a total of 2,000 copies. It also charted on Billboard Japan'''s Top Single Sales chart, on which it peaked at number 88.

Cover version
In 2010, Nakajima recorded a cover of "Yukigasa" as a bonus track for her album, Mayonaka no Dōbutsuen''.

Track listing

Charts

References

2008 songs
2008 singles
Songs written by Miyuki Nakajima
Shizuka Kudo songs
Pony Canyon singles